The 2021–22 Ligue 2 was the 83rd season of the Ligue 2. The season began on 24 July 2021 and concluded on 14 May 2022. The fixtures were announced on 25 June 2021.

Teams

Team changes

Stadia and locations

Personnel and kits

Managerial changes

Number of teams by regions

League table

Results

Promotion play-offs
A promotion play-off competition was held at the end of the season, involving the 3rd, 4th and 5th-placed teams in 2021–22 Ligue 2, and the 18th-placed team in 2021–22 Ligue 1.

The quarter-final was played on 18 May and the semi-final was played on 21 May.

Round 1

Round 2

Promotion Play-off Final1st leg

2nd leg

2–2 on aggregate, Auxerre won 5–4 on penalties and were promoted to 2022–23 Ligue 1; Saint-Étienne were relegated to 2022–23 Ligue 2.

Relegation play-offs
A relegation play-off was held at the end of the season between the 18th-placed team of the 2021–22 Ligue 2 and the 3rd-placed team of the 2021–22 Championnat National. This was played over two legs on 24 and 29 May.

First leg

Second leg

Quevilly-Rouen won 5–1 on aggregate and therefore both clubs remained in their respective leagues.

Statistics

Top scorers

Awards

Monthly

Annual

References

External links
 

Ligue 2 seasons
2
France